Carnley Harbour is a large natural harbour in the south of the Auckland Islands, a subantarctic part of the New Zealand Outlying Islands. Formed from the drowned crater of an extinct volcano, the harbour separates the mainland of Auckland Island from the smaller Adams Island. The harbour is sometimes referred to as the Adams Straits.

The harbour is undeveloped (the Auckland Islands are uninhabited), and has three major arms: North Arm, Musgrave Bay, and Western Arm. Of these, the first two are deep indentations in the coast of Auckland Island; the last connects with Victoria Passage to form a channel separating Auckland and Adams Islands.

References

Landforms of the Auckland Islands
Ports and harbours of New Zealand